Son Yak-seon (손약선, 孫藥仙; born 10 May 1966) is a South Korean former cyclist. She competed in the women's road race event at the 1984 Summer Olympics and 1986 Asian Games.

References

External links
 

1966 births
Living people
South Korean female cyclists
Olympic cyclists of South Korea
Cyclists at the 1984 Summer Olympics
Place of birth missing (living people)
Asian Games medalists in cycling
Cyclists at the 1986 Asian Games
Medalists at the 1986 Asian Games
Asian Games bronze medalists for South Korea
20th-century South Korean women
21st-century South Korean women